Cho In-Chul (born 4 March 1976) won three medals at the World Judo Championships (of which two gold and one bronze) and two olympic medals (a bronze in the 1996 Olympic Games and a silver at the Sydney Olympic Games).

Personal life

After earning a PhD in sports psychology, Cho was named a full professor at Yong-In University.

External links
 
 
 

1976 births
Living people
Judoka at the 1996 Summer Olympics
Judoka at the 2000 Summer Olympics
Olympic judoka of South Korea
Olympic silver medalists for South Korea
Olympic bronze medalists for South Korea
Olympic medalists in judo
Asian Games medalists in judo
Judoka at the 1998 Asian Games
South Korean male judoka
Medalists at the 2000 Summer Olympics
Medalists at the 1996 Summer Olympics
Asian Games gold medalists for South Korea
Medalists at the 1998 Asian Games
Universiade medalists in judo
Universiade silver medalists for South Korea
20th-century South Korean people
21st-century South Korean people